Colymbetes densus is a species of predaceous diving beetle in the family Dytiscidae. It is found in North America.

Subspecies
These two subspecies belong to the species Colymbetes densus:
 Colymbetes densus densus LeConte, 1859
 Colymbetes densus inaequalis Horn, 1871

References

Further reading

 
 

Dytiscidae
Articles created by Qbugbot
Beetles described in 1859